Robert Holbrook may refer to:

Robert Hobrook (politician) of Santa Monica City Council
Robert Boyd Holbrook, actor

See also
Robert Holbrook Smith